Sansanné-Mango Airport  is an airport serving Mango in Togo.

See also
Transport in Togo

References

 OurAirports - Sansanné-Mango
 Great Circle Mapper - Sansanné-Mango

Airports in Togo